This is a listing of the horses that finished in either first, second, or third place and the number of starters in the Florida Derby, an American Grade 1 race for three-year-olds at 1-1/8 miles on the dirt held at Gulfstream Park in Hallandale Beach, Florida. (List from 1971-present)

References

External links 
Complete List of Florida Derby Winners
Gen. Duke wins Florida Derby, 1957

Gulfstream Park
Lists of horse racing results
Triple Crown Prep Races